Baw Law Kyan Daw (1383 – 1390) was the first child of King Razadarit of Hanthawaddy Pegu. The prince is best known for his famous oath before his execution on the orders of his father that he shall be reborn to fight against his father if he were innocent. Razadarit was concerned that the young prince would later raise a rebellion against him as he had driven the prince's mother Queen Tala Mi Daw to commit suicide, and feared that the young prince would one day avenge for his mother's death.

The people of Hanthawaddy and the people of rival Kingdom of Ava widely believed that Prince Minye Kyawswa of Ava was the reincarnation of Baw Law Kyan Daw, fulfilling the prophecy of the oath.

Execution
Razadarit eventually ordered the execution of his own son at a young age. Razadarit was in Bassein (Pathein) when he ordered the execution of his eldest child, only about seven years old,  who was in Pegu (Bago). It was  April 1390.

The king's executioners took the prince to the Shwemawdaw Pagoda. The young prince was imprisoned for three days at the pagoda during which he was said to have reread the Abhidhamma (part of Buddhist scriptures).

According to chronicles, on the day of his execution, the young prince swore an oath that would enter into Burmese history:
I do not plot against my father. Neither is there any fault in me. My father and mother played together as children. When she grew to womanhood, he took her beauty and then cast her away. She was a king's daughter, but he used her like a slavewoman and drove her to an evil death...... If I am guilty of treason by thought, word or deed, may I suffer in the fires of the nether regions for a thousand cycle times. If I am innocent, may I be reborn in the dynasty of Ava kings, and may I become the scourge of my father.''

Razadarit was greatly disturbed when he heard of the terrible oath. In the superstitious world of Burmese politics, he was alarmed when Shin Mi-Nauk, the wife of Prince Min Swe of Ava fetched to eat various foods from Lower Burma before she became pregnant. She gave birth to Minye Kyawswa a year after Baw Law Kyan Daw's death. Indeed, Minye Kyawswa would later grow up to be Razadarit's nemesis.

Notes

References

Bibliography
 
 
 
 
 

Hanthawaddy dynasty
Burmese people of Mon descent
Non-inheriting heirs presumptive